Oleksandr Donets ( (Oleksandr Dmytrovych Donets), born 4 February 1966) is the current head of Antonov State Company, a large Ukrainian aircraft manufacturing and services company.

Biography 
Donets was born on 4 February 1966, in Kyiv, Soviet Ukraine. In 1988, Donets graduated from the Kyiv Institute of Civil Aviation Engineers with a degree in the technical operation of aircraft. He began his career in the Antonov Design Bureau as an operating engineer. He was promoted to chief engineer of the flight test and development base.

From June 2007 to October 2008, Donets headed the work of Aviant. By 2014, he was the general director of the Ukraine Air Enterprise. From September 2015 to November 2016, he worked as assistant director of the State Enterprise for the Air Traffic Services of Ukraine, Ukraerorukh. Beginning in December 2016, he served as the vice president for production of the Antonov State Enterprise. On May 30, 2018, he was appointed head of the Antonov State Enterprise by the order of Ukroboronprom.

References

External links
 Ukroboronprom appoints Donets President of Antonov State Enterprise
 Boeing steps in to help the manufacturer of the world’s biggest plane

Engineers from Kyiv
Businesspeople from Kyiv
20th-century Ukrainian engineers
1966 births
Living people